is a Japanese web manga series written and illustrated by Koume Fujichika. It has been serialized on Akita Shoten's online platform Manga Cross since August 2021.

Publication
Written and illustrated by Koume Fujichika, Tonari no Onee-san ga Suki started on Akita Shoten's online platform Manga Cross on August 25, 2021. Akita Shoten has collected its chapters into individual tankōbon volumes. The first volume was released on May 19, 2022. As of December 20, 2022, two volumes have been released.

Volume list

Reception
The series was nominated for the 2022 Next Manga Award in the web manga category.

See also
The Girl I Like Forgot Her Glasses, another manga series by the same author

References

External links
  

Akita Shoten manga
Japanese webcomics
Romantic comedy anime and manga
Shōnen manga
Webcomics in print